The U.S. Army Office of Energy Initiatives (OEI) is the United States Army's central management office for the development, implementation and oversight of all privately financed, large-scale renewable and alternative energy projects, greater than or equal to 10 megawatts.  Established on October 1, 2014, the office aims to expand on the work of the Army Energy Initiatives Task Force (EITF).

References

External links 

 

United States Army organization
Renewable energy in the United States